Ranunculus andersonii is a species of buttercup known by the common name Anderson's buttercup. It is native to the western United States, including the Great Basin and surrounding regions, where it grows in sagebrush, woodlands, and other habitat. It is a perennial herb producing a basal rosette of thick leaves which are each divided into three double-lobed leaflets at the end of a petiole. The inflorescence arises from the rosette on an erect, leafless stalk usually no more than 20 centimeters tall. It bears one flower with usually five white or red-tinged petals each up to 2 centimeters long with white or pinkish sepals at the base. At the center of the flower are many yellow stamens and pistils. The fruit is an achene, borne in a spherical cluster of 14 or more.  It was named after  Charles Lewis Anderson by Asa Gray.

References

External links
The Jepson eFlora 2013
NatureServe 2012
CalPhotos

andersonii
Flora of the Western United States